The 2008 Evening Standard British Film Awards, held on 4 February 2008  honoured the best British and Irish films of 2007.

Best Film
Control

Atonement (Joe Wright)
Blue Blood (Stevan Riley)
Hallam Foe (David Mackenzie)
It’s a Free World... (Ken Loach)

Best Actor
Daniel Day-Lewis - There Will Be Blood
Jamie Bell (Hallam Foe)
Jim Broadbent (And When did You Last See Your Father?)
Gabriel Byrne (Jindabyne)
James McAvoy (Atonement / Becoming Jane)
Sam Riley (Control)

Best Actress
Helena Bonham Carter - Sweeney Todd / Conversations with Other Women
Julie Christie (Away from Her)
Romola Garai (Atonement)
Keira Knightley (Atonement)
Samantha Morton (Control)
Tilda Swinton (Michael Clayton)

Best Film Score
Jonny Greenwood - There Will Be Blood
Glen Hansard & Marketa Irglova (Once)
Jocelyn Pook (Brick Lane)
John Murphy and Underworld (Sunshine)

Most Promising Newcomer
John Carney - writer/director of Once
Amy Carson (The Magic Flute)
Matthew Beard (And When did You Last See Your Father?)
Saoirse Ronan (Atonement)
Kierston Wareing (It’s a Free World...)

Best Screenplay
Matt Greenhalgh - Control
Christopher Hampton (Atonement)
Ronald Harwood (The Diving Bell and the Butterfly)
Neil Hunter & Tom Hunsinger (Sparkle)
Steven Knight (Amazing Grace / Eastern Promises)
Paul Laverty (It’s a Free World...)
Harold Pinter (Sleuth)

Technical Achievement
Atonement (cinematographer Seamus McGarvey, production designer Sarah Greenwood, costume designer Jacqueline Durran)
Roger Deakins cinematographer (The Assassination **of Jesse James by the Coward Robert Ford / No Country for Old Men)
Chris Gill editor (Sunshine / 28 Weeks Later)
Alwin H. Kuchler cinematographer (Sunshine)
Giles Nuttgens cinematographer (Hallam Foe)

Alexander Walker Award
Julie Christie

Notes

2007 film awards
Independent Film Awards
Evening Standard Awards